Maria Clara Isolde Kurz (21 December 1853 – 5 April 1944) was a German poet and short story writer.

She was born at Stuttgart, the daughter of Hermann Kurz.  She is highly regarded among lyric poets in Germany with her Gedichte (Stuttgart, 1888) and Neue Gedichte (1903).  Her short stories, Florentiner Novellen (1890, 2nd ed. 1893), Phantasien und Märchen (1890), Italienische Erzählungen (1895) and Von Dazumal (1900) are distinguished by a fine sense of form and clear-cut style.

References

1853 births
1944 deaths
German poets
German women short story writers
German short story writers
Writers from Stuttgart
People from the Kingdom of Württemberg
German women poets